Bembecia sareptana is a moth of the family Sesiidae. It is found in Russia (it was described from Sarepta).

The larvae possibly feed on Alhagi camelorum.

References

Moths described in 1912
Sesiidae
Moths of Europe